Saint Raymond may refer to:

 Raymond of Fitero (d. 1163), founder of the Order of Calatrava
 Raymond the Palmer (11401200)
 Raymond of Peñafort (c. 11751275) 
 Raymond Nonnatus (12041240)
 Raymond of Toulouse (saint) (d. 1118)
 Saint Raymond (musician), British singer-songwriter
 Saint-Raymond, Quebec
 St. Raymond High School for Boys in The Bronx, New York

See also
San Ramón (disambiguation)